The 2009–10 First League of the Federation of Bosnia and Herzegovina season was the tenth since its establishment.

League standings

External links
 Futbol24.com
 BIHSoccer.com

First League of the Federation of Bosnia and Herzegovina seasons
2009–10 in Bosnia and Herzegovina football
Bos